Zaid Al-Mutairi (born March 25, 1982) is a Kuwaiti sport shooter. He won a silver medal, as a member of the Kuwaiti shooting team, at the 2006 Asian Games in Doha, Qatar. He also captured two more medals for skeet shooting at the ISSF World Cup circuit (2007 in Maribor, Slovenia, and 2009 in San Marino).

Al-Mutairi represented Kuwait at the 2008 Summer Olympics in Beijing, where he competed in the men's skeet shooting, along with four-time Olympian Abdullah Al-Rashidi. He finished only in tenth place by two points behind his teammate Al-Rashidi, for a total score of 118 targets in the two-day qualifying rounds, and one additional point from the shoot-off match.

References

External links
 

1982 births
Living people
Kuwaiti male sport shooters
Olympic shooters of Kuwait
Shooters at the 2008 Summer Olympics
Asian Games medalists in shooting
Shooters at the 2002 Asian Games
Shooters at the 2006 Asian Games
Shooters at the 2010 Asian Games
Asian Games silver medalists for Kuwait
Medalists at the 2006 Asian Games
Medalists at the 2010 Asian Games